This is a list of notable recorded floods that have occurred in India. Floods are the most common natural disaster in India. The heaviest southwest, the Brahmaputra, and other rivers to distend their banks, often flooding surrounding areas.

In the 20th century 
 In October 1943, Madras (now Chennai) saw the worst flood to hit the city. Flood occurred due to excessive rains that lasted for 6 days and overflowed Coovum and the Adyar rivers. Damage caused to life and property was immense. However, estimate figure is unknown. The flood left thousands of people homeless.
 On 11 August 1979, the Machchu-2 dam situated on the Machchhu River burst, thus flooding the town of Morbi in the Rajkot district of Gujarat. Exact figure of loss of lives is unknown, but it is estimated between 1800 to 2500 people.
 In 1987, Bihar state of India witnessed one of its worst floods till then. Flood occurred due to overflow of the Koshi river; which claimed lives of 1,399 humans, 302 animals and public property worth INR .
 In 1988, Punjab experienced its first flood when all the rivers in Punjab overflowed.
 In July 1993, flash floods killed 530 people across the seven to eight states of India.

In the 21st century 
 Heavy rains across the state of Maharashtra, including large areas of the metropolis Mumbai which received 567 (tmkoc inches) alone on 26 July 2005 killed at-least 1,094 people. The day is still remembered as the day Mumbai came to a standstill, as the city faced worst ever rain.
June 2013 North Indian floods: Heavy rain due to a burst of a cloud caused severe floods and landslides on the North Indian states, mainly Uttarakhand and nearby states. More than 5,700 people were presumed dead. 
 June 2015 Gujarat flood: Heavy rain in June 2015 resulted in widespread flood in Saurashtra region of Gujarat resulting in more than 70 deaths. The wild life of Gir Forest National Park and adjoining area was also affected.
 July 2015 Gujarat flood:Heavy rain in July 2015 resulted in widespread flood in north Gujarat resulting in more than 70 deaths.
 2015 South Indian floods:Heavy rain  in Nov-Dec 2015 resulted in flooding of Adyar, Cooum rivers in Chennai, Tamil Nadu resulting in financial loss and human lives.
 2016 Assam floods: Heavy rains in July–August resulted in floods affecting 1.8 million people and flooding the Kaziranga National Park killing around 200 wild animals.
 2017 Gujarat flood: Following heavy rain in July 2017, Gujarat state of India was affected by the severe flood resulting in more than 200 deaths.
 August 2018 Kerala Flood: Following high rain in late August 2018 and heavy Monsoon rainfall from August 8, 2018, severe flooding affected the Indian state of Kerala resulting over 445 deaths.
 2019 India floods including 2019 Kerala floods: Following high rain in late July and early August 2019, series of floods that affected over nine states in India. The states of Kerala, Madhya Pradesh, Karnataka, Maharashtra and Gujarat were the most severely affected.
Brahmaputra floods 
2020 Assam floods
 2020 Hyderabad floods, flash flood in Hyderabad in October 2020 that caused 98 fatalities, a part of the 2020 North Indian Ocean cyclone season
 2021 Uttarakhand flood, flood in Uttarakhand in February 2021 caused by an avalanche from Ronti peak
 2021 Maharashtra floods, widespread flooding in Mahad and Chiplun on 22 July 2021 caused by exceptionally heavy rainfall.
 2022 Assam floods, heavy flooding in Assam State in May 2022.
 2022 Balrampur floods after heavy rains, with over 1300 villages affected

Climate change 
Climate change is said to have in part caused (but may also be a natural evolution of earth's cycle) large-scale floods across central India, including the Mumbai floods of 2006 and 2017. During 1901-2015, there has been a three-fold rise in widespread extreme rainfall events, across central and northern India – Gujarat, Maharashtra, Madhya Pradesh, Chhattisgarh, Telangana, Odisha, Jharkhand, Assam and parts of Western Ghats – Goa, north Karnataka and South Kerala. The rising number of extreme rain events are attributed to an increase in the fluctuations of the monsoon westerly winds, due to increased warming in the Arabian Sea. This results in occasional surges of moisture transport from the Arabian Sea to the subcontinent, resulting in heavy rains lasting for 2–3 days, and spread over a region large enough to cause floods.

See also  
 List of floods 
 List of deadliest floods 
 Brahmaputra floods

References 

 
Natural disasters in India